Thornley railway station served the village of Thornley, County Durham, England, from 1858 to 1952 on the Hartlepool Dock and Railway.

History 
The station opened in February 1858 by the North Eastern Railway. It was also known as Thornley Junction in Bradshaw from 1879 to 1882 and in the 1880 North Eastern Railway timetable. It closed on 9 June 1952.

References

External links 

Disused railway stations in County Durham
Former North Eastern Railway (UK) stations
Railway stations in Great Britain opened in 1858
Railway stations in Great Britain closed in 1952
1858 establishments in England
1952 disestablishments in England